Rihab is a village in Mafraq Governorate, in northern Jordan.

Antique church buildings
Rihab features numerous natural caves and dozens of churches, most of them dating to the late sixth or early seventh century.

St. Georgeous church in Rihab is claimed to be one of the oldest churches in the world. A cave under the church may have been used for Christian worship as early as AD 33, although this has been contested by experts.

See also
 List of oldest church buildings

References

Further reading
 
 
 
 
 

Populated places in Mafraq Governorate